Seoul is a major center for sports in South Korea. Its professional sports teams compete in football (soccer), baseball, basketball, volleyball.

Overview
Seoul hosted the 1986 Asian Games, commonly known as Asiad, 1988 Olympic Games, and Paralympic Games. It also served as one of the host cities of the 2002 FIFA World Cup. Seoul World Cup Stadium hosted the opening ceremony and first game of the tournament.

Seoul has greatest number of professional sports teams and facilities in South Korea.

In the history of South Korean major professional sports league championships which include the K League, KBO League, KBL, V-League, Seoul had multiple championships in a season 2 times, 1990 K League 1 Lucky-Goldstar FC (currently FC Seoul) and KBO League LG Twins in 1990, K League 1 FC Seoul and KBO League Doosan Bears in 2016

Sports teams in Seoul

Football

Seoul's most popular football club is FC Seoul. Recently, FC Seoul finished as a runner-up in 2013 AFC Champions League.
 Men's football

 Women's football

Baseball

Basketball

 Seoul SK Knights and Seoul Samsung Thunders.

Volleyball
 Seoul Woori Card Wibee and GS Caltex Seoul KIXX

Honours

Football

Domestic
 League Title

 FA Cup

International
 AFC Champions League

Women's Domestic

Baseball

Domestic
 League Title

Basketball

Domestic
 League Title

Volleyball

Domestic 
 League Title

Women's Domestic 
 League Title

Multiple Champions

References

External links
 Seoul Sports Council
 Seoul Sports Facilities Management Office

 
Football in South Korea
Baseball in South Korea
Basketball in South Korea
Volleyball in South Korea
Handball in South Korea